Charles Blair (July 23, 1928 – December 14, 2006) was a Scottish-born Canadian ice hockey player. He played one game in the National Hockey League with the Toronto Maple Leafs during the 1948–49 season, on December 4, 1948 against the Chicago Black Hawks. The rest of his career, which lasted from 1948 to 1961, was mainly spent in the American Hockey League.

Playing career
Blair was born in Edinburgh, Scotland, and while still an infant, he immigrated with his family to Canada. He played junior hockey with the Oshawa Generals before he was called up by the Toronto Maple Leafs to play his one and only National Hockey League game. After spending time with the Toronto Marlboros, Blair signed with the American Hockey League's Pittsburgh Hornets in 1950. In 1953, Blair was traded to the Cleveland Barons and a year later, he was traded again to the Buffalo Bisons. In 1957, Blair moved to the Western Hockey League and signed for the Calgary Stampeders. After two years, he returned to the AHL with the Quebec Aces. He played one more season in the Eastern Hockey League with the Clinton Comets before retiring in 1961. He was the brother of the former professional hockey player George Blair.

Career statistics

Regular season and playoffs

See also
 List of National Hockey League players born in the United Kingdom
 List of players who played only one game in the NHL

References

External links
 

1928 births
2006 deaths
Scottish emigrants to Canada
Buffalo Bisons (AHL) players
Calgary Stampeders (WHL) players
Canadian expatriate ice hockey players in the United States
Canadian ice hockey right wingers
Cleveland Barons (1937–1973) players
Clinton Comets players
Ontario Hockey Association Senior A League (1890–1979) players
Oshawa Generals players
Pittsburgh Hornets players
Quebec Aces (AHL) players
Toronto Maple Leafs players
Toronto Marlboros players